Challow railway station is a former railway station about  south of Stanford in the Vale on the A417 road between Wantage and Faringdon.

History
When the Great Western Railway extended its main line from  through the Vale of White Horse in 1840 it opened the station as Faringdon Road station.

The main station buildings and goods yard were on the up side of the line. A loading dock was provided. The line was originally double track. The 1840-built timber station building on the up side was demolished, replaced by a new brick building. The 1873-built signal box on the down side of the line was also demolished and replaced by a new building. The down side platform was demolished and rebuilt to allow four tracks to run through the station, two fast straddled by two slow, designated Main and Relief. The station's platforms were on the slow lines, with the down platform having a "Pagoda" building, apparently for use as a waiting room. A loading dock was provided at the  end of the down platform. In the goods yard, a grounded coach body served as a Methodist Church from the 1930s.

The last passenger train ran on 5 December. The station closed to freight traffic on 29 March 1965. The signal box closed on 30 May 1965. The goods shed was demolished the next month.

Accidents and incidents
On 25 October 1840, a train overran the end of the line, due to the driver being asleep at controls.
On 4 September 1876, a postal train struck a log which was being loaded onto a wagon and was foul of the running line. The locomotive of the postal train was severely damaged, its smokebox door ending up in the goods yard.
On 1 November 1962, a freight train was derailed whilst being shunted, blocking all four lines through the station.
In late November 1962, A Hall Class locomotive and a wagon were derailed in a shunting accident.
On 21 October 2021, a passenger train operated by Class 800 diesel-electric multiple unit 800301 struck a platelayer's trolley that had been left on the line near the site of Challow Station.

The station today

Few parts of the station survive. The northern platform has almost disappeared completely and the southern platform is used by Network Rail, although no buildings remain and the buildings used by Network Rail are only small portable cabins, including a relay room. New buildings have been built around the site. The most noticeable is the builders' merchants on the site of the northern platform. One nearby public house, the Prince of Wales, was burnt down in 1999 and the site has been levelled.

Freight trains now use the relief lines from between Challow and Wantage Road to wait for High Speed Trains to overtake them.

References

Sources

Disused railway stations in Oxfordshire
Former Great Western Railway stations
Great Western Main Line
Railway stations in Great Britain opened in 1840
Railway stations in Great Britain closed in 1964
Beeching closures in England